Qushkhaneh District is a district in Shirvan County, North Khorasan Province, Iran. At the 2006 census, its population was 13,819, in 3,014 families.  The District has one city Qush khaneh.  The District has two rural districts (dehestan): Qushkhaneh-ye Bala Rural District and Qushkhaneh-ye Pain Rural District.

References 

Districts of North Khorasan Province
Shirvan County